Antoine Pfeiffer (27 February 1940 – 25 February 2021) was a French reformist pastor.

Biography
Born in Périgueux, Pfeiffer's family evacuated to the south of France just before World War II. He was the son of accountant Germain Pfeiffer and Marguerite Brunner. His family returned to Alsace after the war and he studied in Saint-Louis and Mulhouse. He then became a Sunday school teacher and organized summer camps. He became head pastor of the Église réformée du Bouclier in 1976.

In 1982, Pfeiffer was elected to the executive council of the Protestant Reformed Church of Alsace and Lorraine. He then succeeded  as president in 1988, serving four terms until 2000. After his term, he helped assemble the Union of Protestant Churches of Alsace and Lorraine. He was also a member of the Communauté évangélique d'action apostolique, a partnership between churches in the Global North and Global South.

In 1998, Pfeiffer was a representative and consultant to Strasbourg Mayor Roland Ries on the issue of the Strasbourg Mosque. On 14 May of that year, as President of the Protestant Reformed Church of Alsace and Lorraine, he signed a statement in support of the mosque's construction alongside Catholic Archbishop of Strasbourg , Chief Rabbi of Strasbourg René Gutman, and director of the Protestant Church of the Augsburg Confession of Alsace and Lorraine .

Antoine Pfeiffer died in Strasbourg on 25 February 2021, two days shy of his 81st birthday.

Publications
Protestants d'Alsace et de Moselle. Lieux de mémoire et de vie (2006)

References

1940 births
2021 deaths
French Protestants